Pseudovertagus nobilis is a species of sea snail, a marine gastropod mollusk in the family Cerithiidae, the ceriths.

Description

Distribution
This species occurs in the Indian Ocean off Madagascar.

References

 Dautzenberg, Ph. (1929). Contribution à l'étude de la faune de Madagascar: Mollusca marina testacea. Faune des colonies françaises, III(fasc. 4). Société d'Editions géographiques, maritimes et coloniales: Paris. 321–636, plates IV–VII pp.

Cerithiidae
Gastropods described in 1855